William Gregor George (13 October 1903 – prior to 22 March 1933) was a rugby union player who represented Australia.

George, a fly-half, was born in Sydney and claimed a total of 12 international rugby caps for Australia.

Legacy
The Gregor George Shield and Cup were named in his honour.

References

Australian rugby union players
Australia international rugby union players
1933 deaths
Year of birth missing
Rugby union players from Sydney
Rugby union fly-halves